Barry Railway Class L were 0-6-4T steam tank locomotives of the Barry Railway in South Wales.  They were designed by John Auld, his only design for the Barry Railway, built by Hawthorn Leslie and Company and were introduced in 1914. They were originally intended for use on heavy coal trains from Trehafod but, as the B1 class proved more than adequate for the work, they were assigned to different duties.  These included pulling mineral trains from Rhymney and New Tredegar on the Brecon and Merthyr, from Rogerstone Yard on the Great Western and from Neath Junction, also on the Great Western.  They were also to be seen occasionally pulling the suburban service to Cardiff.

Design fault
One characteristic of the locomotive was a design fault that caused it to derail.  The problem would only occur when the locomotive was travelling smokebox-first over facing hand-operated points, usually to be found in colliery sidings, marshalling yards and the dock area.  The rear coupled wheels, nearest the bunker, would force the tongue of the point open, causing the trailing bogie not to follow the driving wheels but to take the wrong road.  These points had the disadvantage of not having a locking mechanism which could be found on facing points on the main line.  At its worst, the result could be derailment, one example being that of No 147 which when entering Barry Sidings with a coal train from Coity, ended up on its side.  Less severe but nonetheless serious damage could also be sustained.  If the balancing pipe between the side and bunker tanks became fractured, the tanks would lose water rapidly, and the fire would have to be dropped to prevent a boiler explosion.  In practical terms, the crews would usually solve the problem by having the fireman hold on to the point lever while the driver took the locomotive through the point extremely slowly.  Several engineering solutions were attempted both on the locomotive and on the track to overcome the problem, but never fully successfully.

Withdrawal
The locomotives passed to the Great Western Railway in 1922 and were scrapped in 1926.  One story has it that they were unintentionally destroyed resulting from a clerical error at Swindon, but this has never been confirmed.  None survived into British Railways ownership and none have been preserved.

Numbering

References

The Barry Railway (reprint with addenda and amendments), Barrie, DSM, Oakwood Press (1983), pp199–200 
Rails to Prosperity – The Barry & After 1884–1984, Miller, Brian J, Regional Publications (Bristol) Ltd (1984), p19 
The Barry Railway – Diagrams and Photographs of Locomotives, Coaches and Wagons, Mountford Eric, R, Oakwood Press Headington (1987), p19  
The Vale of Glamorgan Railway, Chapman, Colin, Oakwood Press Usk (1998), 
The Locomotives of the Great Western Railway – Part Ten, Absorbed Engines, 1922–1947, Reed, P.J.T. et al, The Railway Correspondence and Travel Society (1966) pp K48-K49
Great Western Absorbed Engines, Russell, JH, Oxford Publishing Company (1978), pp 47–48 SBN: 902888749

L
0-6-4T locomotives
Hawthorn Leslie and Company locomotives
Railway locomotives introduced in 1914
Standard gauge steam locomotives of Great Britain
Freight locomotives